Parlato is an Italian surname. Notable people with the surname include:

Carmine Parlato (born 1970), Italian footballer and manager
Charlie Parlato (1919–2007), American trumpet musician
Dennis Parlato (born 1947), American dancer, actor, and singer
Gretchen Parlato (born 1976), American jazz singer
Luca Parlato (born 1991), Italian rower
Salvatore Parlato (born 1986), Italian basketball player

Italian-language surnames